Senator Atkins may refer to:

John DeWitt Clinton Atkins (1825–1908), Tennessee State Senate
Toni Atkins (born 1962), California State Senate
William Atkins (Louisiana politician) (born 1947), Louisiana State Senate

See also
John Atkin, Connecticut State Senate